"No Excuses" is a song by American singer-songwriter Meghan Trainor, released on March 1, 2018, as the lead single from her third major-label studio album, Treat Myself (2020). Trainor co-wrote it with Jacob Kasher Hindlin and Andrew Wells, who produced it as well. The track was announced in February 2018 along with its official single artwork. The pop song, with country and R&B influences, has lyrics against sexism. The song received acclaim from music critics, some of whom noted that it was a return to the sound of Trainor's album Title (2015).

"No Excuses" debuted and peaked at number 46 on the US Billboard Hot 100. It peaked within the top 40 of few countries such as Slovakia, Hungary and Scotland. The track is certified Platinum in the US and Canada, and Gold in Australia. Colin Tilley directed the music video for "No Excuses", which features visual effects showing Trainor with two carbon copies of herself and donning various outfits that were inspired by the 1980s, in pastel-colored backdrops. She performed the song on several shows, including The Ellen DeGeneres Show, The Tonight Show Starring Jimmy Fallon, Sport Relief, Sounds Like Friday Night and The Today Show.

Background and release
Meghan Trainor had been searching for a producer to create her upcoming third major-label studio album Treat Myself (2020) with, when she conducted the first session for it with songwriter Jacob Kasher Hindlin. He suggested that they work with then-unknown producer Andrew Wells. Trainor, who was expecting the session to go "really bad or really awesome", ended up writing the song "Let You Be Right" with them, and knew Wells "was the one". The trio subsequently wrote "No Excuses" and recorded it on January 17, 2018, with Wells producing the song. "No Excuses" was one of the last songs written for the album. While describing the song, Trainor said "it needs to be heard right now -- the world could use a song like this. It's about respect -- we need a little more R-E-S-P-E-C-T in the world, especially right now," and called it the "sassiest" song on its parent album.

She revealed the song's title and overall vibe on The Tonight Show Starring Jimmy Fallon by saying, "don't disrespect me. I'm a woman, have you never met one before?" In the following days, Trainor revealed song lyrics including: "I don't disrespect you, don't you disrespect me", and "Have you lost your mind...open up your eyes." On February 25, 2018, Trainor referenced the song in a letter she published on her site and social media, followed by unveiling of the single's artwork the next day. "No Excuses" was digitally released on March 1, 2018, as the lead single from Treat Myself. In the United Kingdom, the song was serviced to contemporary hit radio on March 2. It was sent to hot adult contemporary radio in the United States on March 5, and contemporary hit radio the next day. "No Excuses" was also serviced to contemporary hit radio in Italy on March 9, as well as mainstream radio in Australia.

Composition

"No Excuses" is composed in the key F♯ major with a tempo of 115 beats per minute in common time. The chords in the verses alternate between F and B, while Trainor's vocals span from F3 to C5. Sonically, "No Excuses" is a pop song with country and R&B influences. It was described as a sexism-blasting empowerment anthem. It features Trainor singing over a "funky, retro" beat. Trainor sings the lyrics, "What you sipping on that got you talking crazy? Looking at me sideways, always coming at me," over an incandescent beat. According to Idolator writer Mike Nied, the song is a confident take-down of a disrespectful suitor, that has "fiery" production and playful lyrics and Trainor sounds "right at home" on it.

Critical reception
The song received acclaim from music critics. Writing for the Daily Express, Shaun Kitchener thought that "No Excuses" was Trainor returning to the "bouncy pop roots" of her first major-label studio album, Title (2015). Entertainment Tonight Canada writer Shakiel Mahjouri noted that the song is taking an aim at sexism, and added that the funky and retro song showcases Trainor's "trademark wit and attitude". MTV News' Sam Prance described the song as "amazing" and "incredible" and dubbed it a "stomping girl-power anthem" with a brilliant and catchy chorus. Hugh McIntyre of Forbes called the song a solid pop offering that is suitable for all ages, adding that it is "tailor-made to be the type of hit that everyone can get behind" and a perfect utilization of the call and response technique.

Writing for Bustle, Emily Czachor praised the track, writing that it "touts a marked air of female grit," which seems "particularly relevant right now." It was described as a "newly minted, funk-laden" song. Jezebels Clover Hope likened it to Aretha Franklin's rendition of "Respect" (1967) and called it a "sassy Time's Up-inspired jam", adding "the orchestrated sass is built into Trainor's voice." A Plus writer Jill O'Rourke was positive of the song, calling it "empowering" and adding, "it's all about demanding respect." Mike Nied of Idolator wrote that Trainor "has a serious hit on her hands", describing it as "the sassy pop bop we need in 2018". In a 2020 album review, Nied stated that it "still holds up as a gem", adding that "with its supersized production and unapologetically sassy message", it is "so quintessentially Meghan it simply could not have been forgotten".

Chart performance
"No Excuses" debuted and peaked at number 46 on the Billboard Hot 100 and spent a total of 12 weeks on the chart. The song peaked at number 17 on the Adult Contemporary chart and at number 16 on the Mainstream Top 40 chart. It was certified platinum by the Recording Industry Association of America (RIAA) for one million copies certified units. "No Excuses" peaked at number 49 on the Canadian Hot 100, and at number eight on the Canada Hot AC chart, being certified platinum by Music Canada (MC). The song reached number 60 in Australia and number 4 on the New Zealand Heatseekers chart. Despite its low peak, it was certified gold by the Australian Recording Industry Association (ARIA) in the former country. "No Excuses" made the top 40 in a few countries: number 21 in Hungary, number 26 in Scotland and number 20 on Slovakia's Radio Hot 100 chart.

Music video
The song's music video, directed by Colin Tilley, premiered on the same day as the song's release, which Trainor had previously teased on her Instagram account along with a short behind the scenes look at it. The video features visual effects showing the singer with two "carbon copies" of herself. The video features looks inspired by the '80s, including Trainor donning a denim jacket and another one that looks like a cheerleader outfit. Patrick Hosken of MTV News noted that the looks "belong in a mall-pop video from 1987."

An official choreography video for "No Excuses" was released in collaboration with Zumba, on March 5, 2018. It was directed by Tim Milgram. The visual features a "fun, easy" and empowering routine. It made Trainor the first recording artist to star in an official Zumba choreography video. Describing the initiative, the singer stated that always hearing her music in Zumba classes at the gym made her want to create something special for "No Excuses". She intended the choreography to "empower everyone out there to get on their feet", and think about "respect, sassiness and loving [themselves]". The VP of marketing for Zumba said that they have "always been focused on inspiring others to feel empowered and confident", and they hear these themes in Trainor's music which makes her an ideal partner.

On April 3, 2018, Trainor released a dance video to her Vevo page featuring a group of children and young adults performing "energetic" choreography to the song; Trainor herself does not feature in the video. The singer and her creative director, Charm LaDonna, hand-selected the dancers to execute a choreographed dance routine to "No Excuses".

Live performances
Trainor sung "No Excuses" live on The Ellen DeGeneres Show on March 2, 2018. During this performance, the singer wore white trousers and a denim jacket, and was accompanied by a vocal quartet. According to Idolator's Mike Nied, Trainor delivered "pitch-perfect" vocals in front of the simple stage that featured a lot of glitter. She also performed it on The Tonight Show Starring Jimmy Fallon on March 5. Trainor wore a glitter-infused top with a "dazzling" jacket and wide-legged pants, joined by a group of four backup dancers and vocalists who wore black, crystallized outfits. A spacey background was projected on a screen and it ended with the group chanting in unison. On March 23, the singer sang the track during the 2018 Sport Relief telethon on BBC One. On April 6, 2018, Trainor performed the song on Sounds Like Friday Night, and an acoustic version of it during an appearance on The Today Show, alongside her backup singers and a guitarist playing the song, the same month. "No Excuses" was performed as part of a medley with "All About That Bass", "Let You Be Right" and "Me Too" at the 2018 iHeartRadio MMVAs, held on August 26, 2018.

Personnel 
Credits adapted from the album liner notes, Treat Myself (2020).

 Andrew Wellsproducer, engineer, guitar, recording engineer, songwriter
 Meghan Trainorlead vocals, background vocals, songwriter
 Jacob Kasherbackground vocals, songwriter
 Daryl Sabarabackground vocals
 Kelli Trainorbackground vocals
 Matt Wolachbackground vocals, engineer

 Ryan Trainorbackground vocals
 Jonas Jalhayguitar, recording engineer
 John Hanesmixing engineer
 Serban Gheneamixing engineer
 Randy Merrillmastering engineer

Charts

Weekly charts

Year-end charts

Certifications

Release history

References

External links
 

2018 singles
2018 songs
Epic Records singles
Meghan Trainor songs
Music videos directed by Colin Tilley
Songs written by Jacob Kasher
Songs written by Meghan Trainor
Songs written by Andrew Wells (record producer)